Braden Adam Bishop (born August 22, 1993) is an American former professional baseball outfielder. He played in Major League Baseball (MLB) for the Seattle Mariners. He was drafted by the Mariners in the 3rd round of the 2015 Major League Baseball draft.

Early and personal life

Bishop was born in Woodland, California. His hometown is San Carlos, California. His parents are Randy (who owns a private investigation company) and Suzy Bishop (who ran track at UCLA and has been a movie producer and head of the Vancouver Film School in Canada), and he has a younger brother, Hunter (who is an outfielder for the San Francisco Giants organization). Spurred by his mother Suzy's struggle with early onset Alzheimer's disease starting at age 54, he has started a charity to spread awareness of the affliction known as “4Mom.” His mother died at age 59 in October 2019. The brothers are creating the "Suzy Bishop Memorial Grant" in their mother's honor, which will be gifted once a year to a family affected by Alzheimer's.

Bishop attended St. Francis High School in Mountain View, California.  He then attended the University of Washington in Seattle, Washington, where he played baseball for the Washington Huskies. In 2014, he batted .304/.394/.359 with 21 steals (leading the Pac-12 Conference) in 24 attempts. After the 2014 season, he played collegiate summer baseball with the Brewster Whitecaps of the Cape Cod Baseball League. In his senior year in college he was  All-Pac-12, and selected to the All-Pac-12 Defensive Team.

Professional career

Seattle Mariners
Bishop was drafted by the Atlanta Braves in the 36th round of the 2012 Major League Baseball draft out of high school, and by the Seattle Mariners in the 3rd round of the 2015 Major League Baseball draft out of college.

Bishop signed with the Mariners and played in 2015 for the Everett AquaSox of the Class A- Northwest League, batting .320 (second in the league)/.367/.393 with 13 steals in 16 attempts, and led the league with 12 HBP and 11 sacrifice hits. In August 2015 MLBPipeline.com ranked Bishop as the Mariners' #14 prospect. He was named Northwest League Player of the Week on August 24, 2015, a Northwest League Post-Season All Star, and an MILB.com organization All Star.

In 2016, Bishop played for the Clinton LumberKings of the Class A Midwest League, and the Bakersfield Blaze of the Class A+ California League, batted a combined .273/.338/.326 with 8 steals in 9 attempts, and was named a California League All Star. MLBpipeline.com ranked him the #9 Mariners prospect.

In February 2017 MLB.com ranked him the #6 Mariners prospect, the best defensive player in the organization, and tied for the best runner in the organization. Bishop began 2017 with the Modesto Nuts of the California League, batted .296/.385/.400 with 16 steals in 20 attempts and was the MVP in the mid-season California League All Star Game, and was promoted to the Arkansas Travelers of the Class AA Texas League. In July 2017 Baseball America ranked him the #7 2017 mid-season prospect of the Mariners. With Arkansas, he batted .336/.417/.448. In 2017 MLBpipeline.com ranked him the #5 Mariners prospect. The Seattle Times named Bishop the Mariners' 2017 Player of the Year, and he was named the Jewish Baseball News Minor League MVP. He played for the Peoria Javelinas in the Arizona Fall League in the fall of 2017, and was an AFL All Star.

In 2018 MLBpipeline.com ranked him the #5 Mariners prospect. Playing for the Arkansas Travelers of the Class AA Texas League, he batted .284/.361/.412 with 70 runs (tied for 10th in the league), 8 home runs, and 33 runs batted in over 345 at bats.

After the 2018 season, the Mariners added Bishop to their 40-man roster. On March 19, 2019, the Mariners announced that Bishop was included on their Opening Day active roster. Bishop made his MLB debut on March 21 as a defensive replacement in the 8th inning, replacing Ichiro Suzuki in right field during Ichiro's final game. Bishop struck out in his first big league at bat. On March 23, he was optioned to the AAA Tacoma Rainiers. In 2020, Bishop slashed .167/.242/.233 with 5 hits, 4 runs batted in, and 1 stolen base across 12 games.

After notching only 1 hit in 5 plate appearances in 8 games, Bishop was designated for assignment on May 13, 2021.

San Francisco Giants
On May 17, 2021, Bishop was claimed off waivers by the San Francisco Giants. On May 22, Bishop was designated for assignment by San Francisco. He was outrighted to the Triple-A Sacramento River Cats on May 26. In 288 at bats for the River Cats, he batted .326/.388/.549 with 58 runs and 12 home runs. He became a free agent following the season.

Arizona Diamondbacks
On January 13, 2022, Bishop signed a minor league contract with the Arizona Diamondbacks. He began the season playing for the Triple-A Reno Aces. On June 7, 2022, Bishop was released.

Minnesota Twins
On June 18, 2022, Bishop signed a minor league contract with the Minnesota Twins. He elected free agency on November 10, 2022.

Retirement

On March 3, 2023, Bishop formally announced his retirement from professional baseball on his Instagram account.

References

External links

1993 births
Living people
Arkansas Travelers players
Bakersfield Blaze players
Baseball players from California
Brewster Whitecaps players
Clinton LumberKings players
Everett AquaSox players
Major League Baseball center fielders
Modesto Nuts players
People from San Carlos, California
Peoria Javelinas players
Seattle Mariners players
Tacoma Rainiers players
Washington Huskies baseball players